Hiroko Kuwata (born 18 December 1990) is a Japanese tennis player.

Kuwata has won seven singles titles and 20 doubles titles on the ITF Circuit. On 9 May 2016, she reached her best singles ranking of world No. 150. On 13 July 2015, she peaked at No. 112 in the WTA doubles rankings.

Career
Kuwata made her WTA Tour debut at the 2014 Citi Open, having entered the qualifying tournament and defeating Sanaz Marand and Stéphanie Dubois for a spot in the main draw. She was thereby pitted against world No. 45 Alison Riske and defeated the American in straight sets, losing five games in the process. It was Kuwata's first main-draw win at the WTA level. She also competed in the doubles event, partnering with Kurumi Nara to defeat Nicola Slater and Emily Webley-Smith in the first round. The Japanese advanced to the final of the event, losing to Shuko Aoyama and Gabriela Dabrowski.

WTA career finals

Doubles: 1 (1 runner-up)

ITF Circuit finals

Singles: 15 (7 titles, 8 runner–ups)

Doubles: 35 (20 titles, 15 runner–ups)

Notes

References

External links
 
 

1990 births
Living people
People from Yokohama
Sportspeople from Yokohama
Japanese female tennis players
Universiade medalists in tennis
Universiade gold medalists for Japan
Universiade silver medalists for Japan
Universiade bronze medalists for Japan
Medalists at the 2011 Summer Universiade
Medalists at the 2013 Summer Universiade
20th-century Japanese women
21st-century Japanese women